1600s may refer to:
 The century from 1600 to 1699, almost synonymous with the 17th century (1601-1700). 
 1600s (decade), the period from 1600 to 1609